Marcos Vidal is a Christian music singer and songwriter. In 1997 he won the International Award GMA as the best non-English male vocalist. In 2016, he won the Latin Grammy Award for Best Christian Album at the 17th Annual Latin Grammy Awards.

Biography

Although born in Germany, Vidal has lived most of his life in Spain. He speaks Spanish as his first language.

In 1990, at the age of 18, Marcos Vidal released his first studio album, Buscadme y Viviréis.

In 1993 he released his second studio album, Nada Especial on the Nuevos Medios label that along with the success of his first album, drew the singer to North and South America. This international recognition allowed Vidal to begin working with Sparrow Records, making Marcos Vidal the first Spanish Christian singer signed to an American label. His first two albums were later re-released in the United States under the label.

In 1996, Cara a Cara, his first album recorded for Sparrow Records, was released. It became one of the best selling Spanish Christian albums of all time, rapidly passing 100,000 albums sold. In 1997, Vidal released Mi Regalo and was nominated for his first Dove Award in the category of Best Spanish Language Album.

Por La Vida, released in 1999, was a collection of his greatest hits from previous albums.

His next project, Pescador, (2002), emphasized his passion to share the Gospel with people of all nations and was centered on the theme of being a fisherman. Alabanza y Adoración en Vivo desde España (2003), was Vidal's first live album, in which he combined traditional congregational singing with more contemporary upbeat rhythms.

Vidal currently resides in Madrid and pastors the Evangelical Church of Salem, which has led since 1992. He also continues to compose and record music. His 2016 album "25 años", produced by Tom Brooks and Josué Pineda won the Latin Grammy Award for Best Christian Album at the 17th Annual Latin Grammy Awards.

Discography

External links 

Salmista.com Marcos Vidal

References

Christian music songwriters
Performers of Christian music
1971 births
Living people
Musicians from Madrid